Omesh Wijesiriwardene (born 10 March 1983) is a Sri Lankan cricketer. He played 81 first-class and 33 List A matches between 2000 and 2016. He was also part of Sri Lanka's squad for the 2002 Under-19 Cricket World Cup.

References

External links
 

1983 births
Living people
Sri Lankan cricketers
Bloomfield Cricket and Athletic Club cricketers
Chilaw Marians Cricket Club cricketers
Moors Sports Club cricketers
Ruhuna cricketers
Singha Sports Club cricketers
Sri Lanka Ports Authority Cricket Club cricketers
Tamil Union Cricket and Athletic Club cricketers
Sportspeople from Galle